Moritz Horschetzky (1777 or 1788 – 7 November 1859) was an Austrian physician, writer, and translator.

He was born to a Jewish family in Bydzov, Bohemia, in 1777 or 1788. He received a traditional early education, attended the Israelitische Hauptschule in Prague, and later acquired a doctorate in medicine in Vienna.

Horschetzky married into the prominent Lackenbacher family; his father-in-law Hirsch Lackenbacher was leader of the Jewish community of Nagykanizsa, Hungary, where Horschetzky began practising medicine in 1811. He went on to run the town's Jewish hospital and serve as director of the Jewish community school. He became a member of the Royal Hungarian Academy of Sciences in 1845.

As a writer he devoted himself chiefly to the works of Josephus, whose Antiquities he translated and in part annotated (1826, 1843, 1851). He possessed remarkable humor, which appears in his fictitious Reiseberichte Nathan Ghazzati's (1848), which Julius Fürst took to be a translation from Hebrew.

He died in Nagykanizsa on 7 November 1859.

Bibliography

References
 

1788 births
1859 deaths
19th-century Austrian Jews
19th-century Hungarian Jews
19th-century Hungarian physicians
Austrian Empire Jews
Austrian Empire physicians
Bohemian Jews
19th-century Hungarian historians
Jewish historians
Jewish physicians
Jewish translators
Members of the Hungarian Academy of Sciences
People from Nagykanizsa
People from Nový Bydžov
Translators from Greek
Translators to German